"The Lover in Me" is a song by Scottish singer Sheena Easton for her ninth studio album of the same name (1988). Released as the album's lead single on 11 October 1988, the song became Easton's first top-20 hit in the United Kingdom after a seven-year hiatus. The song was also Easton's final top-10 single on the US Billboard Hot 100.

"The Lover in Me" was written by Kenneth "Babyface" Edmonds, Antonio "L.A." Reid and Daryl Simmons, and produced by Reid and Babyface, who were at the peak of their success at the time as a songwriting and production team.

Chart performance
"The Lover in Me" reached number two on the US Billboard Hot 100, becoming her biggest hit there since "9 to 5 (Morning Train)", and it stayed on the chart for 25 weeks. It also went to number two on the Billboard Dance Club Songs chart.

Music video
The accompanying music video for "The Lover in Me" was directed by Dominic Sena and features Easton singing and dancing in a nightclub.

Track listings
7-inch single and cassette single
 "The Lover in Me" – 4:10
 "The Lover in Me" (instrumental) – 4:10

Standard 12-inch single
A1. "The Lover in Me" (extended version) – 6:59
B1. "The Lover in Me" (radio edit) – 5:20
B2. "The Lover in Me" (instrumental) – 6:59

UK 12-inch and mini-CD single
A1. "The Lover in Me" (extended version) – 6:55
B1. "The Lover in Me" (instrumental) – 6:55
B2. "The Lover in Me" (bassapella) – 5:13

Charts

Weekly charts

Year-end charts

Release history

References

1987 songs
1988 singles
MCA Records singles
Music videos directed by Dominic Sena
Sheena Easton songs
Song recordings produced by Babyface (musician)
Song recordings produced by L.A. Reid
Songs written by Babyface (musician)
Songs written by Daryl Simmons
Songs written by L.A. Reid